Nihmatallah Akashat Zibiri, known as Nyma, is a Nigerian lawyer and television host. She is co-host on TVC's daytime show Your View.

Life
She graduated in law from Lagos University, and was called to the Nigerian Bar.

A practicing Muslim, Nihmatallah Akashat has declared that "My hijab is my identity". She was inspired to go into television by wanting to increase Muslim representation in broadcasting. Having watched Your View since its inception, she applied and was hired after the show advertised for a Muslim co-host.

Akashat Zibri continues to practise law. In 2016 she co-founded a law firm, Cynosure Practice barristers and solicitors, where she is a managing partner.

In 2019 she controversially defended child marriage as preferable to premarital sex:

References

Year of birth missing (living people)
Living people
21st-century Nigerian lawyers
Nigerian women lawyers
Nigerian television presenters
Nigerian women television presenters
Nigerian Muslims